Whose Baby? is a 1986 Australian miniseries about a baby swap in 1945. It was filmed in Melbourne and Kyneton and had a budget of $2.7 million.

References

External links

Whose Baby? at TCMDB

1980s Australian television miniseries
1986 Australian television series debuts
1986 Australian television series endings